As Good Cooks Go was a black-and-white British sitcom that aired on BBC1 from 1969 to 1970. Written by John Warren (actor), and John Singer, it starred Tessie O'Shea and Frank Williams.

Cast
Tessie O'Shea – Blodwen O'Reilly
Robert Dorning – Mr Bullock (pilot)
Frank Williams – Mr Bullock (series)

Plot
Blodwen O'Reilly is a cook who works in many different establishments. She turns a transport café into a quality restaurant, works in an Army canteen and prepares meals in an old people's home.

Episodes

Pilot (1969)
Pilot (5 May 1969) (part of Comedy Playhouse)

Series One (1970)
Episode One (28 January 1970)
Episode Two (4 February 1970)
Episode Three (11 February 1970)
Episode Four (18 February 1970)
Episode Five (25 February 1970)
Episode Six (4 March 1970)

As was BBC practice of the time, all of the episodes were later junked, and none survive in the archives as of 2022.

References

Mark Lewisohn, "Radio Times Guide to TV Comedy", BBC Worldwide Ltd, 2003

External links

1969 British television series debuts
1970 British television series endings
1960s British sitcoms
1970s British sitcoms
BBC television sitcoms
Comedy Playhouse
Lost BBC episodes
English-language television shows